Chaetophora  may refer to:
 Chaetophora (alga), a genus of algae in the family Chaetophoraceae
 Chaetophora (beetle), a genus of beetles in the family Byrrhidae